Nonglang village is located in Mawkyrwat Tehsil of South West Khasi Hills district in Meghalaya in India.

References

Villages in South West Khasi Hills district